"Hit the Road Jack" is a song written by the rhythm and blues singer Percy Mayfield and recorded by Ray Charles. The song was a US number 1 hit in 1961, and won a Grammy award for Best Rhythm and Blues Recording, becoming one of Charles' signature songs.
The song was played in the 1995 film Grumpier Old Men.

Background
The song was written by Percy Mayfield, who first recorded it in 1960 as an a cappella demo sent to music executive Art Rupe. It became famous after it was recorded by the singer-songwriter-pianist Ray Charles, with The Raelettes vocalist Margie Hendrix. 

Charles's recording hit number one for two weeks on the Billboard Hot 100, beginning on Monday, October 9, 1961. "Hit the Road Jack" won a Grammy award for Best Rhythm and Blues Recording.  The song was number one on the R&B Sides chart for five weeks, thereby becoming Charles's sixth number-one on that chart. The song was ranked number 387 on Rolling Stone magazine's 2010 list of "The 500 Greatest Songs of All Time"; it had ranked at number 377 on the original 2004 list.

The Chantels released an answer song, "Well, I Told You" which charted at No. 29.

The vocal sample and lyrics have been used in contemporary music.

Charts and certifications

Charts

Certifications

The Stampeders version
In 1976, Canadian band The Stampeders released a version of the song taken from their album Steamin' featuring DJ Wolfman Jack. The song reached No. 6 in Canada and No. 40 in the US.

References 

1960 songs
1961 singles
ABC Records singles
The Animals songs
Billboard Hot 100 number-one singles
Cashbox number-one singles
Number-one singles in New Zealand
Paramount Records singles
Ray Charles songs
Songs written by Percy Mayfield
Male–female vocal duets